The EasyUp Parapropter is an American paramotor that was designed by Tom Tate and produced by EasyUp of Medford, Oregon. Now out of production, when it was available the aircraft was supplied in the form of blueprint-style plans and an instruction manual for amateur construction. A kit was also available at one time.

Design and development
The Parapropter was designed as an inexpensive way for beginners to start flying and complies with the US FAR 103 Ultralight Vehicles rules. It features a paraglider-style wing, single-place accommodation and a single engine in pusher configuration. As is the case with all paramotors, takeoff and landing is accomplished by foot.

The aircraft plans allow the builder to create the backpack portion of the aircraft, including the propeller cage, built from bolted and welded aluminium plate and tubing. The plans recommend purchasing a used paraglider canopy to save money and a variety of engines can be fitted. The recommended propeller is a wooden fixed-pitch unit. Inflight steering is accomplished via handles that actuate the canopy brakes, creating roll and yaw.

The designer estimated the construction time from the supplied plans to be 40 hours.

Operational history
By 1998 the company reported that 750 sets of plans had been sold.

Specifications (Parapropter, typical engine and canopy)

References

External links

Official photos of the Easyup Parapropter

Parapropter
1990s United States sport aircraft
1990s United States ultralight aircraft
Single-engined pusher aircraft
Paramotors